Register Cliff is a sandstone cliff and featured  key navigational landmark prominently listed in the 19th century guidebooks about the Oregon Trail, and a place where many emigrants chiseled the names of their families on the soft stones of the cliff  it was one of the key checkpoint landmarks for parties heading west along the Platte River valley west of Fort John, Wyoming which allowed travelers to verify they were on the correct path up to South Pass and not moving into impassable mountain terrainsgeographically, it is on the eastern ascent of the Continental divide leading upward out of the great plains in the east of the U.S. state of Wyoming. It is notable as a historic landmark for 'registering' hundreds of emigrants on the Oregon Trail (thus also the other northern Emigrant Trails that split off farther west such as the California Trail and Mormon Trail) who came to follow custom and inscribed their names on its rocks during the western migrations of the 19th century. An estimated 500,000 emigrants used these trails from 1843 to 1869, with up to one-tenth dying along the way, usually due to disease.

Register Cliff is the easternmost of the three prominent emigrant "recording areas" located within Wyoming, the other two being Independence Rock and Names Hill.

The site was listed on the National Register of Historic Places in 1969.

According to its nomination, the site was where emigrants would camp on their first night west of Fort Laramie.  The property was donated by Henry Frederick to the state of Wyoming, to be preserved.

Geology
It consists of The horizontal layers of sedimentary rocks eroded by the river. Level grass plains run from the cliff to the river. Primary erosion was by water and the continuing effects of wind and rain have little changed its features.

Gallery

See also
 Guernsey State Park
 Oregon Trail
 Oregon Trail Ruts (Guernsey, Wyoming)

References

External links

Register Cliff State Historic Site Wyoming State Parks, Historic Sites & Trails
Register Cliff Wyoming State Historic Preservation Office
List of names on Register Cliff Wyoming State Library

California Trail
Mormon Trail
Oregon Trail
Protected areas of Platte County, Wyoming
Wyoming state historic sites
Inscribed rocks
Road transportation on the National Register of Historic Places
Natural features on the National Register of Historic Places in Wyoming
National Register of Historic Places in Platte County, Wyoming